Matt Baugh  (born 24 July 1973) is a British diplomat who was ambassador to Somalia, the first for 20 years.

Career
Baugh was educated at The Oratory School and Bristol University. After graduating BA in history and MSc in international policy, he joined the British civil service in the Department for International Development (DFID). After various posts he was head of the Post-Conflict Reconstruction Unit (now the Stabilisation Unit) 2005-06, head of DFID's Iraq department 2006-07, and Principal Private Secretary to the Secretary of State for International Development (Douglas Alexander) 2008-09.

Baugh was DFID's representative for Somalia 2010–11, and in February 2012 he was appointed the UK's Ambassador to Somalia, the first to serve in over twenty years. Baugh initially worked out of the British diplomatic office in Nairobi. On 25 April 2013, he re-located to Mogadishu, as the UK diplomatic mission for Somalia officially re-opened its embassy in the Somali capital. On 6 June 2013, Baugh was succeeded by Neil Wigan as the British Ambassador to Somalia; Baugh was appointed OBE in the 2013 Birthday Honours "for services to promoting peace and security
in Somalia" and transferred to be head of the Africa department (Central and Southern) at the Foreign and Commonwealth Office in London, before being transferred to become the head of East and West Africa Department.

References

1973 births
Living people
People educated at The Oratory School
Alumni of the University of Bristol
Ambassadors of the United Kingdom to Somalia
Officers of the Order of the British Empire